Mount Bailey is a mountain,  high, which stands south of Anthony Glacier and  west-southwest of Lewis Point, on the east coast of Palmer Land, Antarctica. It was charted in 1936–37 by a British Graham Land Expedition sledge party under John Riddoch Rymill, and was recharted in 1947 by a joint sledge party consisting of members of the Ronne Antarctic Research Expedition (RARE), and the Falkland Islands Dependencies Survey. It was named by Finn Ronne for Commander Clay W. Bailey, U.S. Navy, a member of the Byrd Antarctic Expedition, 1933–35, and the West Base party of the U.S. Antarctic Service, 1939–41, who assisted in outlining the RARE radio requirements.

References 

Mountains of Palmer Land